"The Baron" is a song originally recorded by Johnny Cash. It was released as a single in March 1981 and included on the album The Baron released in June of that year.

Released as a single (Columbia 11-60516, with "I Will Dance with You" on the B-side), the song reached number 10 on U.S. Billboard country chart for the week of May 30, 1981.

Track listing

Charts

References

External links 
 "The Baron" on the Johnny Cash official website

Johnny Cash songs
1981 songs
1981 singles
Songs written by Billy Sherrill
Song recordings produced by Billy Sherrill
Columbia Records singles